José Reinaldo Azevedo e Silva (Dois Córregos, August 19, 1961) is a Brazilian journalist. Currently, Reinaldo is a columnist in Folha de S.Paulo newspaper and acts as a commentator on RedeTV! News, of RedeTV! channel, in addition to presenting the program "Pela Ordem" on the platforms of the station. Azevedo's blog was listed in 2014 as one of the top ten political blogs in Brazil. 

He had for 12 years his blog hosted on the site of Veja, however, on May 23, 2017, decided to rescind contract with the magazine, migrating his blog to RedeTV! Portal. On the same date, he resigned from the Jovem Pan radio, where he anchored the evening program "Os Pingos nos Is". The next day, the journalist made his debut as an anchor in the program "Pela Ordem" on RedeTV! channel, from which he was later fired. That same week, he also signed a contract with Radio BandNews FM, whose new program "O É da Coisa" debuted at 6 pm on May 29, 2017.

Political views
Reinaldo Azevedo has positioned himself on the right of the political spectrum of Brazilian politics, with economically liberal, even libertarian stances, and a moderate conservative commentator. Despite that, he also has shown extremely left wing and progressists ideas, and he has also been a stench defender of the Brazilian authoritarianism, and the lack of rule of law, since former and self-exiled right-wing Brazilian president, Jair Bolsonaro, started to attack Brazilians progressists, culminating in vandalism on January, 8, 2022. Due to this, Reinaldo Azevedo, previously a harsh critic of the Workers Party (PT) and the current far-left president, Luis Inácio (Lula) da Silva, sided with Lula on the runoffs of the 2022 Brazilian election against Bolsonaro and the right.

Because of that Bolsonaro supporters (know in Brazil as "bolsominons") rightfully accuse him of have turned into a left wing activist and even a communist. 

The journalist criticizes the Operation Car Wash (Portuguese: Operação Lava Jato), because the excesses of the prosecutors of the task force disregard the laws and threaten the rule of law.

Works
 Contra o Consenso – Ensaios e Críticas (2005) 
 O País dos Petralhas (2008)
 Máximas de Um País Mínimo (2009) 
 O País dos Petralhas II – O inimigo agora é o mesmo (2012)
 Objeções de um Rottweiller Amoroso (2014)

External links
 Reinaldo Azevedo's Blog on UOL
 Reinaldo Azevedo. Folha de S.Paulo

References

Living people
Brazilian journalists
Male journalists
Brazilian anti-communists
1961 births
Brazilian columnists
Conservatism in Brazil
Methodist University of São Paulo alumni